Ta Kwu Ling is an area in the North District, New Territories, Hong Kong, located northeast of Sheung Shui, close to the border with mainland China.

Ta Kwu Ling is one of three new development areas currently being planned for North District, in parallel with Fanling North and Kwu Tung North.

Its name is frequently heard in weather reports, since it often experiences the highest and lowest daily temperatures in Hong Kong, due to its inland location.

One of the three strategic landfills in use in Hong Kong is located in Ta Kwu Ling.

Before 4 January 2016, parts of Ta Kwu Ling fell within the Frontier Closed Area and a Closed Area Permit was required.

Administration
For electoral purposes, Ta Kwu Ling is part of the Sha Ta constituency of the North District Council. It is currently represented by Ko Wai-kei, who was elected in the local elections.

Villages
The following villages are part of the Ta Kwu Ling District Rural Committee:

 Chow Tin Tsuen
 Chuk Yuen
 Fung Wong Wu
 Ha Shan Kai Wat
 Heung Yuen Wai
 Kan Tau Wai
 Lei Uk
 Lo Wu
 Muk Wu
 Nga Yiu
 Nga Yiu Ha
 Ping Che
 Ping Yeung
 San Uk Ling
 Sheung Shan Kai Wat
 Tai Po Tin
 Tak Yuet Lau
 Tong Fong
 Tsung Yuen Ha
 Wo Keng Shan

Education

Ta Ku Ling is in Primary One Admission (POA) School Net 81. Within the school net are multiple aided schools (operated independently but funded with government money); no government schools are in the net.

Ta Ku Ling Ying Public School is in Ta Kwu Ling. In 2013 it had one class per year, but it was scheduled to have four primary 1 classes with a total of 128 students the following year. In 2013 the school was receiving an expansion including classrooms, a library, and a teachers' room due to an increase in students who are Hong Kong residents living in Shenzhen.

Transport
The area is far from its nearest major road, Sha Tau Kok Road, connecting Fanling to Sha Tau Kok. Branch roads connect to the major road via the Ping Che area in the south.

Climate

See also
 MacIntosh Forts

References

North District, Hong Kong
Areas of Hong Kong
Restricted areas of Hong Kong red public minibus